The Singapore Grand Prix is a motor racing event which forms part of the Formula One World Championship. The event takes place on the Marina Bay Street Circuit and was the inaugural night race and first street circuit in Asia designed for Formula One races.

The original Singapore Grand Prix was held at Thomson Road from 1966 to 1973, before returning to the calendar in 2008 at Marina Bay. Fernando Alonso won the inaugural Formula One edition of the renewed Grand Prix, driving for the Renault team amid controversial circumstances, when it emerged a year later that his teammate Nelson Piquet Jr. had been ordered to crash on purpose by senior team management to bring out the safety car at a time chosen to benefit Alonso. The race itself was also notable for being the 800th Formula One World Championship race since its inception in 1950, and the first ever Formula One race held at night.

Since its inception, Marina Bay has been known for featuring at least one safety car in every race edition, with a total of 23 safety car deployments as of 2022. The Singapore Grand Prix has been considered to be one of the most challenging and unique tracks on the Formula One calendar. Sebastian Vettel has the most wins on the track, with five Singapore Grand Prix victories. In 2022, a contract extension was announced which will put the race on the Formula One calendar until at least 2028.

History

Formula Libre
First organised in 1961, the race was initially known as the Orient Year Grand Prix, located at the Thomson Road Grand Prix circuit.

It was renamed to the Singapore Grand Prix in 1966, shortly after Singapore became a sovereign country in 1965. The event was discontinued after 1973 and a variety of reasons have been suggested, including an increase in traffic, the very high danger and unsuitability of the track for racing, the inconvenience of having to close roads for the event and fatal accidents during the 1972 and 1973 races.

Formula One

Announced in 2008, an agreement for a five-year deal was signed by Singapore GP Pte Ltd, the Singapore Tourism Board and Bernie Ecclestone. In November 2007, it was announced that the telecommunications company Singtel would be the title sponsor of the event. The official name of the event became the Formula 1 SingTel Singapore Grand Prix. The race was co-funded by the Government of Singapore, footing 60% of the total bill, or S$90 million, out of a total tab of S$150 million.

Around 110,000 tickets were made available for the country's first Formula One race. Corporate hospitality suites and packages went on sale at the end November 2007, three-day passes to the public went on sale in February 2008. Single-day passes went on sale a month later. The event went on to achieve a full sell-out for all of its tickets. The 2008 race hosted the Amber Lounge after-party and in 2010, Singapore became the second location to host the Amber Lounge Fashion show.

2008

The first race held at the new Marina Bay Street Circuit was the 15th round of the 2008 FIA Formula One World Championship, and was also the first night-time event in Formula One history. The timing of the night event also meant that it could be broadcast live at a convenient time for TV audiences outside of the Asia-Pacific. The track was also illuminated by a series of projectors which adapt their output to match the shape of the course. On track, Felipe Massa was the first man to sit on the Singapore pole in his Ferrari, and dominated the race until he was released early at a pit stop, breaking his fuel rig and dropping him to last place. The race was won by Fernando Alonso driving for the Renault team, though that result has since been tarnished by controversy. Renault were found to have ordered Nelson Piquet Jr. to crash, as the ensuing safety car would strongly benefit Alonso.

 Pole position: Felipe Massa (Ferrari) – 1:44.801 (174.055 km/h)
 Race winner: Fernando Alonso (Renault) – 1:57:16.304 (61 laps)
 Fastest lap: Kimi Räikkönen (Ferrari) – 1:45.599 (172.740 km/h)

2009

For the 2009 race, the circuit was reprofiled slightly, including modifications to turns 1, 2 and 3 to aid overtaking, and also at turn 10 where high kerbs caused many accidents in 2008. McLaren driver and reigning World Champion Lewis Hamilton took pole position and sprinted away to win. Timo Glock finished second for Toyota, and Fernando Alonso was third in the first race for Renault after they received a suspended disqualification from the sport for manipulating the previous year's race.
 Pole position: Lewis Hamilton (McLaren) – 1:47.891 (169.270 km/h)
 Race winner: Lewis Hamilton (McLaren) – 1:56:06.337 (61 laps)
 Fastest lap: Fernando Alonso (Renault) 1:48.240 (168.725 km/h)

2010

Fernando Alonso became the first man to win twice in Singapore. Now at Ferrari, he took pole and resisted Red Bull's Sebastian Vettel on his way to the 25th victory of his F1 career. Michael Schumacher, making his F1
comeback in 2010, struggled in his Mercedes and was 13th, while Heikki Kovalainen leapt from his burning Lotus T127, borrowed a fire extinguisher and put the fire out himself.

 Pole position: Fernando Alonso (Ferrari) – 1:45.390 (173.287 km/h)
 Race winner: Fernando Alonso (Ferrari) – 1:57:53.579 (61 laps)
 Fastest lap: Fernando Alonso (Ferrari) – 1:47.976 (169.137 km/h)

2011

Sebastian Vettel, an eight-time winner in 2011 before Marina Bay, led the drivers' championship by over 100 points. He won the race from his 11th pole of the season. Vettel, Button, Webber, Alonso and Hamilton filled the top five places. Michael Schumacher again struggled as he slammed into the Sauber of Sergio Pérez.

 Pole position: Sebastian Vettel (Red Bull) – 1:44.381 (174.962 km/h)
 Race winner: Sebastian Vettel (Red Bull) – 1:59:06.757 (61 laps)
 Fastest lap: Jenson Button (McLaren) – 1:48.454 (168.392 km/h)

2012

On 22 September 2012, the AP reported that Bernie Ecclestone and the Singapore Grand Prix had agreed that the Grand Prix would remain on the Formula One calendar until 2017. Lewis Hamilton claimed his fifth pole of the season for McLaren and his second in Singapore. A surprise visitor to the front row alongside him was the Williams of Pastor Maldonado, but it was Sebastian Vettel's Red Bull that inherited the race lead when Hamilton pulled out with gearbox problems. Vettel then dedicated his 23rd Grand Prix win to Sid Watkins, who had died shortly before the race.

 Pole position: Lewis Hamilton (McLaren) – 1:46.362 (171.704 km/h)
 Race winner: Sebastian Vettel (Red Bull) – 2:00:26.144 (59 laps)
 Fastest lap: Nico Hülkenberg (Force India) – 1:51.033 (164.480 km/h)

2013

For the 2013 race, it was announced that the 10th turn of the track, the "Singapore Sling" chicane, would be reconfigured so the cars would have to navigate a flowing left-hander before accelerating towards the Anderson Bridge.

Sebastian Vettel took his third successive win in Singapore with Red Bull and the 33rd of his career as a fourth straight title also loomed. He did it from his second Singapore pole, recovering from the surprise of seeing Nico Rosberg's Mercedes briefly ahead at race start to take victory by over half a minute. Fernando Alonso was on the podium yet again before stopping his Ferrari to pick up Mark Webber, whose Red Bull was in flames at Turn 7.

 Pole position: Sebastian Vettel (Red Bull) – 1:42.841 (177.302 km/h)
 Race winner: Sebastian Vettel (Red Bull) – 1:59:13.132 (61 laps)
 Fastest lap: Sebastian Vettel (Red Bull) – 1:48.574 (167.574 km/h)

2014

On 15 April 2014, it was announced that Singapore Airlines would sponsor the Singapore Grand Prix, starting from that year.

F1's new-generation turbo-charged, hybrid-powered cars brought a new look to the track, ending the reign of the 2.4-litre power unit, but a controversial ban on radio communications dominated pre-race proceedings. Mercedes's Lewis Hamilton sailed to his seventh win of the year, becoming Singapore's third multiple winner in the process as teammate Nico Rosberg retired with technical problems. Sebastian Vettel, bound for Ferrari in 2015, finished second ahead of new Red Bull partner Daniel Ricciardo.

 Pole position: Lewis Hamilton (Mercedes) – 1:45.681 (172.538 km/h)
 Race winner: Lewis Hamilton (Mercedes) – 2:00:04.795 (60 laps)
 Fastest lap: Lewis Hamilton (Mercedes) – 1:50.417 (165.137 km/h)

2015

Lewis Hamilton arrived in Singapore one pole position shy of his idol Ayrton Senna's record run of eight in a row. Another win would also put Hamilton on 41 – the same number as Senna. Sebastian Vettel took his first Ferrari pole, then made it four wins at Marina Bay as Hamilton retired with a loss of electrical power just after half-distance. Daniel Ricciardo split the two Ferraris in second place, while Formula One rookie Max Verstappen shouted 'No!' when told to move over for Toro Rosso teammate Carlos Sainz.

During the 2015 race a spectator entered the track on the straight after Anderson Bridge, as leaders Sebastian Vettel and Daniel Ricciardo sped by. He climbed over the fencing when the safety car was deployed. Eventual race winner Vettel described the man as 'crazy' in his post-race interview. The 27-year-old man was arrested by Singapore police after the incident. CCTV footage showed he had sneaked through a gap in the fencing.

 Pole position: Sebastian Vettel (Ferrari) – 1:43.885 (175.521 km/h)
 Race winner: Sebastian Vettel (Ferrari) – 2:01:22.118 (61 laps)
 Fastest lap: Daniel Ricciardo (Red Bull) – 1:50.041 (165.701 km/h)

2016

Nico Rosberg was making his 200th Grand Prix start. He was locked in a two-man tussle for the title with Mercedes teammate Lewis Hamilton. Rosberg took pole position, and held off Daniel Ricciardo to win while Hamilton finished third. Rosberg went on to win the title.

 Pole position: Nico Rosberg (Mercedes) – 1:42.584 (177.747 km/h)
 Race winner: Nico Rosberg (Mercedes) – 1:55:48.950 (61 laps)
 Fastest lap: Daniel Ricciardo (Red Bull) – 1:47.187 (170.113 km/h)

2017

On 19 June 2017, the FIA's World Motor Sport Council in Geneva released its provisional 2018 calendar, in which the Singapore Grand Prix was given a tentative date of 16 September. At the time, the race (as well as the Chinese Grand Prix in Shanghai) were subject to confirmation by the commercial rights holders. On the eve of the 2017 race, the track and F1 announced an extension for the race through 2021. This race was a critical event in the season as polesitter and title contender, Sebastian Vettel, was involved in a first corner collision with Ferrari teammate Kimi Räikkönen and Red Bull's Max Verstappen, which led to the retirement of all three drivers. Vettel's title rival, Mercedes's Lewis Hamilton, took full advantage and won the race from 5th on the grid to extend his championship lead over Vettel from 3 points to 28.

 Pole position: Sebastian Vettel (Ferrari) – 1:39.491 (183.272 km/h)
 Race winner: Lewis Hamilton (Mercedes) – 2:03:23.544 (58 laps)
 Fastest lap: Lewis Hamilton (Mercedes) – 1:45.008 (173.643 km/h)

2018

After a disappointing weekend in Monza, Ferrari arrived in Singapore with high hopes of a victory. However, Lewis Hamilton took pole position, ahead of Max Verstappen and the Ferrari of Vettel. At the start, the two Racing Point Force India drivers, Sergio Pérez and Esteban Ocon had an incident which resulted in Ocon retiring. Vettel overtook Verstappen right before the Safety Car was deployed. Vettel was the first of the front runners to pit, on lap 15. He was put on ultrasoft tyres, while most other people who pitted during that time went for the softs. He exited behind Pérez but overtook him a lap later. Verstappen pitted for soft tyres on lap 18, and exited just in front of Vettel. Vettel, being on the higher wear ultrasofts, did not attack in order to make it to the end. On lap 34, Pérez had a clash with Sergey Sirotkin which resulted in him getting a drive-through penalty. Sirotkin himself got a 5-second time penalty after forcing Brendon Hartley off the track. Later on in the race, he was battling with Romain Grosjean as Hamilton and Verstappen approached to lap them. Instead of letting the leaders pass, Grosjean continued to attack Sirotkin which allowed Verstappen to close the gap to Hamilton and nearly overtake him. The Frenchman was handed a 5-second penalty and 2 penalty points on his licence. In the end Hamilton won, with Verstappen second and Vettel third, increasing his championship lead over the German to 40 points.

 Pole position: Lewis Hamilton (Mercedes) – 1:36.015 (189.832 km/h) All Time Lap Record
 Race winner: Lewis Hamilton (Mercedes) – 1:51:11.611 (61 laps)
 Fastest lap: Kevin Magnussen (Haas) – 1:41.905 (178.860 km/h) Official Lap Record

2019 

 Pole position: Charles Leclerc (Ferrari) – 1:36.217 (189.434 km/h) 
 Race winner: Sebastian Vettel (Ferrari) – 1:58:33.667 (61 laps)
 Fastest lap: Kevin Magnussen (Haas) – 1:42.301 (178.168 km/h)

2020–2021

Both the 2020 and 2021 iterations of the event were cancelled due to the global COVID-19 pandemic and the resulting travel restrictions then-imposed by the Government of Singapore, on arriving foreign tourists.

2022 

On 27 January 2022, the Singapore Grand Prix's contract was extended up to 2028.

 Pole position: Charles Leclerc (Ferrari) – 1:49.412 (166.588 km/h) 
 Race winner: Sergio Pérez (Red Bull) – 2:02:20.238 (59 laps)
 Fastest lap: George Russell (Mercedes) – 1:46.458 (171.211 km/h)

2023 
The 2023 Singapore Grand Prix is expected to have major changes in the layout, with Turns 16–19 set to be temporarily removed to facilitate the construction of NS Square. Instead, there will be a new flat-out section until turn 16 (currently turn 20), with number of laps increasing from 61 to 63 and lap times to decrease by approximately twenty seconds. Race distance is expected to be covered by one half an hour unlike previous editions usually lasting until the two hours time limit.

Track description

Although the track has seen some minor changes as seen above, the basic layout has in many aspects remained unchanged. It is a twisty circuit that is the slowest in Formula One running at normal race distance above , which combined with its features of proximity to walls leads to frequent safety cars, further extending the running to nearing the race time limit of two hours.

The race tests the limits for both drivers and cars. It has some 90-degree turns, but with a high degree of variability, featuring technical sections and quick direction changes. Overtaking is primarily done at the end of the first sector, where top speeds are at their highest. Runoff areas exist at the end of the long straights, but are short by Formula One standards. At most parts of the track, cars run very close to the walls. In general, victory is dependent on a drivers' experience and skills.

The Singapore Grand Prix has been frequently described by drivers as being the “toughest race of the Formula 1 calendar”; the endurance of drivers is heavily strained due to various factors such as high heat, high humidity, high amount of sweat and bodily fluid loss, high number of corners (23 in total), little margin for error (due to the lack of run-off area within a street circuit) and race finishes always completing near to the 2-hour allocated time limit (with 4 races being time-limited, instead of completing the allotted laps).

Attendance

Winners

Repeat winners (drivers)
Drivers in bold are competing in the Formula One championship in the current season.
A pink background indicates an event which was not part of the Formula One World Championship.

Repeat winners (constructors)
Teams in bold are competing in the Formula One championship in the current season.
A pink background indicates an event which was not part of the Formula One World Championship.

Repeat winners (engine manufacturers)
Manufacturers in bold are competing in the Formula One championship in the current season.
A pink background indicates an event which was not part of the Formula One World Championship.

* Built by Cosworth

By year
A pink background indicates an event which was not part of the Formula One World Championship.

Track layouts

See also
 List of Formula One Grands Prix

Notes

References

Further reading

External links

 Singapore Grand Prix Official Website

 
Events in Singapore
Motorsport in Singapore
Formula One Grands Prix
National Grands Prix
Recurring sporting events established in 1966
1966 establishments in Singapore